The Yaglakar clan was the first imperial clan of the Uyghur Khaganate. Descendants of the Yaglakar clan would later establish the Ganzhou Uyghur Kingdom.

Origin 
The clan was named after a mythical founder Yaglakar Khan or Buk Khan (卜可汗). Initially a part of Tiele Confederation, they carried the hereditary title elteber later as subjects of the Tang dynasty. The first known member of the clan was Tegin Irkin (特健俟斤 *dək̚-ɡɨɐnH ʒɨX-kɨn > Tèjiàn Sìjīn).

Chiefs of the clan

Khagans 

By the death of Yaoluoge Achuo in 795, the main line of the Yaglakar clan ceased to exist. However, successive khagans adopted the Yaglakar surname for prestige. The rest of the clan members were exiled to the Tang capital Chang'an. An epitaph was recently found in 2010 in Xi'an which belonged to one of the Yaglakar princes, Prince Gechuai (葛啜王子), younger brother of Yaoluoge Dunmohe who died of cold fever on 11 June 795 and was buried on 28 June 795.

However, another line of the Yaglakar clan came to rule the Ganzhou Uyghur Kingdom in 890s.

Ganzhou Uyghur kings 

The last member of the clan, Baoguo Qaghan, committed suicide in 1032 after the Ganzhou Uyghur Kingdom was annexed by the Western Xia. Yuri Zuev proposed that the Yaglakar clan survived and eventually became Mongolized under the name "Jalairs".

References 

 
Nomadic groups in Eurasia
Turkic dynasties
Uyghur Khaganate
Clans